"Not Over Yet" is a song by British dance act Grace. Originally released to clubs in 1993, under the band name State of Grace, it was re-released in 1995 as the first single from their only album, If I Could Fly (1996). It peaked at number six on the UK Singles Chart and reached number-one on the US Billboard Hot Dance Music/Club Play chart. Lead vocals and backing vocals were performed by singer Patti Low. In 1995, the lead vocals were replaced by new frontwoman and singer, Dominique Atkins for the album release, although Low's backing vocals remained in place. This Atkins/Low combination appeared on all subsequent re-releases and remixes of the track. The woman who appears in the accompanying music video is Low.

In 1999, "Not Over Yet" was remixed by Planet Perfecto, a pseudonym of Paul Oakenfold, a co-writer of the song. It again reached the Top 20, peaking at number 16. Oakenfold also used it with much less singing in another remix called "Not Over", which appeared on his second album, A Lively Mind (2006).

Critical reception
Scottish Aberdeen Press and Journal described the song as "uplifting". AllMusic editor Michael Gallucci felt that it "makes any sort of lasting impression". J.D. Considine from The Baltimore Sun remarked in his review of If I Could Fly, "But rather than try to make the listener dance, as so many divas do, Grace would rather entice us — and there's something wonderfully inviting about that." Larry Flick from Billboard wrote, "Grace has it all—a highly videogenic image, an angelic voice, and the ability to write material that deftly straddles commercial viability and underground hipness. She has already wooed punters in her native U.K. with this silky slice of trance/disco, and early reaction from tastemaking radio-programmers hints that even greater stateside success is on the horizon." In his weekly UK chart commentary, James Masterton viewed it as "another dance hit from the Perfecto stable, wildly commercial and sending clubgoers wild the country over". Later, writing for Dotmusic, he felt it is "easily one of the best dance hits of the year so far". Mixmag named it Single of the Week, adding, "Quite simply the best record I have heard in months. Vibrant, passionate and ultimately spiritual." Pan-European magazine Music & Media commented, "Not over yet? No way, it's only just beginning, the renewed appreciation of synth or electro pop—of course in a fashionable new dance coat. The girl sings gracefully in a sea of sequencers." James Hamilton from Music Weeks RM Dance Update called it a "sweetly cooed commercial techno scamperer" and a "haunting sweet girl cooed and fluttery synth chugged attractive simple burbling old raver".

Chart performance
"Not Over Yet" proved to be a major hit in several countries. It peaked within the top 10 in Ireland (number four), Scotland (number seven) and the United Kingdom. In the latter, it reached number six on 9 April 1995, in its second week on the UK Singles Chart. But the song went to number-one on both the UK Dance Singles Chart and Music Weeks Club Chart. Additionally, it was a top 40 hit in Iceland and Sweden. On the Eurochart Hot 100, "Not Over Yet" reached its highest position as number 12 on 22 April. Outside Europe, it peaked at number one also on the US Billboard Hot Dance Club Play chart, number five in Israel and number 144 in Australia.

Impact and legacy
Mixmag ranked "Not Over Yet" number 91 in its "100 Greatest Dance Singles of All Time" list in 1996. It was also included as number 15 in their "Mixmag End of Year Lists: 1995".

DJ Magazine ranked it number 38 in their list of "Top 100 Club Tunes" in 1998.

MTV Dance ranked it number 64 in their list of "The 100 Biggest 90's Dance Anthems of All Time" in November 2011.

Attitude ranked it number five in their list of "The Top 10 Dance Tunes of the '90s" in 2016, writing, "There are some beautiful '90s tracks that got lost in the 'novelty' of the '90s, and this is one of them."

Mixmag ranked it as one of "The 15 best mid-90s trance tracks" in 2018, adding, "Dominique Wilkins' soaring vocals steal the show and she delivers one of dance's most recognisable earworms on the hook in a storm of sonic, melody-driven madness."

Tomorrowland featured the song in their official list of "The Ibiza 500" in 2020.

The Lostprophets song, "Everybody's Screaming" from the album Liberation Transmission included the titular chorus line, "It's not over, not over, not over, not over yet" into the outro as a tribute. According to Ian Watkins at local music show The Full Ponty, this song was written about how the bandmates hated their jobs. They went going out dancing at a club in Pontypridd after a bad week at work, and "Not Over Yet" was a song that they'd dance to every week.

Track listing

 UK 12" (1993)A. "Not Over Yet" (Perfecto Mix) – 7:38
B1. "Not Over Yet" (Trance Mix) – 6:23
B2. "Not Over Yet" (State Of Grace Mix) – 6:05

 UK vinyl single, 12" (1995)A. "Not Over Yet" (Perfecto Edit) – 4:20
A. "Not Over Yet" (Perfecto Mix) – 7:38
A. "Not Over Yet" (Dancing Divaz Club Mix) – 7:15
B. "Not Over Yet" (BT's Spirit Of Grace) – 12:27
B. "Not Over Yet" (BT's Peyote Dub) – 7:42 

 UK 12" (B.T. Remixes) (1995)A. "Not Over Yet" (B.T.'s Spirit Of Grace) – 12:30
B. "Not Over Yet" (B.T.'s Peyote Dub) – 9:05

 UK CD single (1995)"Not Over Yet" (Perfecto Edit) – 4:21
"Not Over Yet" (Perfecto Mix) – 7:39
"Not Over Yet" (Dancing Divaz Club Mix) – 7:46
"Not Over Yet" (B.T.'s Spirit Of Grace) – 12:28
"Not Over Yet" (B.T.'s Peyote Dub) – 7:42 

 UK CD single (1999)"Not Over Yet 99" (Radio Edit) – 3:35
"Not Over Yet 99" (Matt Darey Remix (Edit)) – 8:11
"Not Over Yet 99" (Da Sickboys Remix) – 7:38
"Not Over Yet 99" (Breeder's It Is Now Remix) – 10:25
"Not Over Yet 99" (Perfecto Edit) – 4:20

Charts

Weekly charts

Year-end charts

Remixes
In 1999, "Not Over Yet" was re-released by Planet Perfecto, a supergroup consisting of Paul Oakenfold, Ian Masterson and Jake Williams which featured re-recorded vocals and new mixes. It again reached the top 20, peaking at number 16.

A remixed version with new vocals (by Ryan Tedder of OneRepublic), only featuring the words "not over yet" from the original appeared on Oakenfold's 2006 album A Lively Mind as "Not Over". The vocals of this version could be seen as an answer song to the original track, as the vocals cover the same topic - the end of a relationship; and are sung by a man.

In 2001, BT released the album R&R (Rare & Remixed).  A remix of "Not Over Yet" was included on this album, as track 5 on disc 1, credited as 'Grace (BT's Spirit of Grace)'.

During BBC Radio 1's Live Lounge with Jo Whiley on 8 February 2008, Goldfrapp performed a cover version of the song with a more acoustic sound than the club-style original.

In 2011, new remixes by Perfecto Records were released under the name Grace - Not Over Yet and it was announced via Tilts official Facebook page that a new track was in the process of being written for Grace/Dominique Atkins.
Remixes for the re-release of the single include Max Graham vs. Protoculture, Jonas Hornblad, and Robert Vadney.

Klaxons version

"Not Over Yet" was covered by British band Klaxons as "It's Not Over Yet" and released as the fifth official single from their debut album, Myths of the Near Future (2007). The track was released as a single on 25 June 2007 featuring an exclusive B-side, "The Night" (a cover of a song by Frankie Valli and the Four Seasons) as well as an exclusive remix by Blende (available through the iTunes Store).

The song, upon its release, entered the UK Singles Chart at number 28 before peaking at number 13 on 7 July 2007. It received extensive airplay on a number of the United Kingdom's top radio stations, such as Xfm, as well as receiving moderate airplay on the MTV Two/NME Chart.

The song has been remixed by dubstep artist Skream. The song featured in the Channel 4 advertisement for the finale of the first series of Ugly Betty, and is also featured in many episodes of Hollyoaks.

Music video
The accompanying music video for the track was released in May 2007. It features the band dressed up as samurai, wielding swords to destroy flying prism shaped objects.

Track listing
 CD single "It's Not Over Yet" – 3:35
 "My Love" [BBC Radio 1 Session] (Justin Timberlake cover)

 7-inch vinyl (clear-colored) "It's Not Over Yet" – 3:35
 "The Night" (Frankie Valli and the Four Seasons Cover)Etched 7-inch vinyl'
 "It's Not Over Yet" – 3:35

Charts

Weekly charts

Year-end charts

Certifications

References

1993 songs
1995 debut singles
2007 singles
Grace (group) songs
Klaxons songs
Songs written by Rob Davis (musician)
Songs written by Paul Oakenfold
Perfecto Records singles
East West Records singles
Polydor Records singles